

An abrasive saw, also known as a cut-off saw or chop saw, is a circular saw (a kind of power tool) which is typically used to cut hard materials, such as metals, tile, and concrete. The cutting action is performed by an abrasive disc, similar to a thin grinding wheel. Technically speaking this is not a saw, as it does not use regularly shaped edges (teeth) for cutting.

These saws are available in a number of configurations, including table top, free hand, and walk behind models.  In the table top models, which are commonly used to cut tile and metal, the cutting wheel and motor are mounted on a pivoting arm attached to a fixed base plate.  Table top saws are often electrically powered and generally have a built-in vise or other clamping arrangement.  The free hand designs are typically used to cut concrete, asphalt, and pipe on construction sites.  They are designed with the handles and motor near the operator, with the blade at the far end of the saw.  Free hand saws do not feature a vise, because the materials being cut are larger and heavier.  Walk-behind models, sometimes called flat saws are larger saws which use a stand or cart to cut into concrete floors as well as asphalt and concrete paving materials.

Abrasive saws typically use composite friction disk blades to abrasively cut through the steel. The disks are consumable items as they wear throughout the cut. Larger saws use  diameter blades. Disks are available for steel and stainless steel. Abrasive saws can also use superabrasive (i.e., diamond and cubic boron nitride or CBN) blades, which last longer than conventional abrasive materials and do not generate as hazardous particulate matter. Superabrasive materials are more commonly used when cutting concrete, asphalt, and tile; however, they are also suitable for cutting ferrous metals.

Since their introduction, portable cut-off saws have made many building site jobs easier. With these saws, lightweight steel fabrication previously performed in workshops using stationary power bandsaws or cold saws can be done on-site. Abrasive saws have replaced more expensive and hazardous acetylene torches in many applications, such as cutting rebar.  In addition, these saws allow construction workers to cut through concrete, asphalt, and pipe on job sites in a more precise manner than is possible with heavy equipment.

See also 
Angle grinder
Cold saw
Miter box
 Ring saw

References

Sources

External links 
Saw Blade Troubleshooting

Cutting machines
Metalworking cutting tools
Saws